Dodon may refer to
Dodon (farm), a farm and former tobacco plantation in Maryland, U.S.
 Dodon, Kyrgyzstan, a village in Kyrgyzstan
 L'Isle-en-Dodon, a commune in France
 Lac Dodon, an iron meteorite discovered in Canada
 Igor Dodon (born 1975), President of Moldova
 Galina Dodon (born 1977), First Lady of Moldova

See also
Dodona (disambiguation)
Dodone (disambiguation)